Red King, White Knight is a 1989 American political thriller television film directed by Geoff Murphy and written by Ron Hutchinson. The film stars Tom Skerritt as Bill Stoner, a retired CIA operative who is sent to the Soviet Union to determine the truth behind assassination rumors. It also stars Max von Sydow as his old KGB adversary Szaz and Helen Mirren as his former girlfriend Anna.

At the 42nd Primetime Emmy Awards, von Sydow was nominated for Outstanding Supporting Actor in a Miniseries or a Special for his role in the film.

Plot
The CIA hears of a KGB scheme to assassinate the Soviet General Secretary and enlists Stoner, an agent retired for 10 years, to go to Russia to investigate. He verifies the plot, but then has trouble leaving the country. In the meantime, the U.S. policy makers struggle over whether or not to inform the Soviets of the plot. Stoner's problems are complicated by the renewal of an affair with Anna, a Russian, as he tries to convince her to defect.

Cast
 Tom Skerritt as Stoner
 Max von Sydow as Szaz
 Helen Mirren as Anna
 Tom Bell as Tulayev
 Gavan O'Herlihy as Clancy
 Barry Corbin as Bentick
 Clarke Peters as Jones
 Lou Hirsch as Baetz
 Kerry Shale as Viktor

Release
Red King, White Knight premiered on HBO on November 25, 1989.

References

External links
 

1989 films
1989 television films
1980s political thriller films
1980s spy thriller films
American political thriller films
American spy thriller films
Films about assassinations
Films about the Central Intelligence Agency
Films about the KGB
Films directed by Geoff Murphy
Films produced by John Kemeny
Films scored by John Scott (composer)
Films set in Moscow
Films set in the Soviet Union
Films shot in Budapest
Films shot in Washington, D.C.
HBO Films films
Cold War spy films
Spy television films
American thriller television films
1980s English-language films
1980s American films